Rolf Joacim Sjöström (born 31 August 1964) is a Swedish former footballer. He made 39 Allsvenskan appearances for Djurgården. He also played 41 matches for AIK in Allsvenskan.

References

Swedish footballers
Djurgårdens IF Fotboll players
AIK Fotboll players
1964 births
Living people
Allsvenskan players
Association football goalkeepers
Footballers from Stockholm